is a Japanese pop rock singer, lyricist, fashion model and television presenter.

Career 
Born in Adachi, Tokyo, Japan to a Japanese mother and British father, Kimura started working as a model in 2002 for the Japanese magazine Seventeen. She went on to host the morning television show Saku Saku from April 14, 2003 to March 31, 2006.

Kimura released her only indie single, titled "Level 42", but it was later released as her major label debut single on June 23, 2004, after she signed with Columbia Music Entertainment. The song was used over the end credits of Saku Saku. On October 27, Kimura released her second single, "Happiness!!!", which was followed by her debut album, Kaela, on December 8, 2004.

Following the release of her third single, "Rirura Riruha", on March 30, 2005, Kimura saw her fanbase grow considerably. The song was used in a series of Vodafone commercials in Japan and helped make her a household name. It sold over 100,000 copies, her best-selling single to date, and it also received a nomination for "Best Video" in the MTV Video Music Awards Japan 2005. Nearly seven months later, her next single, "Beat", was released. The song was composed by Tamio Okuda. The song had a more pop punk influence. On January 18, 2006, Kimura released her fifth single, "You". In March 2006, Circle was released and debuted at number two on the Oricon chart. She continued promoting Kit Kat with a promotional single titled "Circle"; a CD with the song was sold along with the candy in a limited package. At this point, Kimura decided to leave the TV show, Saku Saku, to focus on her music career. Her last appearance as host was on March 31, 2006.

During 2006, Kimura became the lead vocalist of the rock band Sadistic Mika Band, which started as a collaboration for Kirin products promotion, and later resulting in the album Narkissos as Sadistic Mikaela Band. That year, she also covered Roy Orbison's Oh, Pretty Woman, which was used as the theme song of 2006 Japanese television dramas Attention Please starring Aya Ueto. She appeared on the program in a cameo role as an airline passenger in episode 10.

On June 28, a new single, "Magic Music", was released, followed by the release of "Tree Climbers" three months later. Her eighth single, "Snowdome", was released in conjunction with her third studio album, Scratch, on February 7, 2007. The song "Snowdome" was composed by Japanese pop punk band Beat Crusaders. The album Scratch topped the Oricon Albums Chart for two weeks and sold over 300,000 copies.

Kimura's ninth single, "Samantha", was released on July 18, 2007. The song was inspired by Samantha Stephens, the protagonist from the ABC TV series, Bewitched; and the music video features Hanna-Barbera designs. In September, a second DVD from her 'Scratch Tour' was released, followed by her tenth single, "Yellow", a month later. She released her eleventh single, "Jasper", a dance song very different from her previous works, in early 2008. On April 2, her fourth album, +1, was released and debuted on the Oricon weekly albums chart at number three. After the album's release, Kimura hosted her '+1 TOUR' and released her first music video compilation Best Video 1.

On September 10, 2008, she released her first double A-side single . The first A-side was used in Lucido-L commercials, while the second was featured in the Japanese film . Kimura released her first ballad, titled  on January 28, 2009, reaching number five on Oricon, and her fourteenth single, "Banzai", on May 8, followed by her fifth studio album, Hocus Pocus, on June 24, celebrating her fifth anniversary as a singer.

Personal life 
On September 1, 2010, Kimura married actor Eita after becoming engaged in late 2009. Although the official marriage announcement was delayed due to work commitments. They have a son (born October 2010, though without a disclosed exact birthdate or name), and a daughter (born October 2013).

Discography 

 Kaela (2004)
 Circle (2006)
 Scratch (2007)
 +1 (2008)
 Hocus Pocus (2009)
 8Eight8 (2011)
 Sync (2012)
 Rock (2013)
 Mieta (2014)
 Punky (2016)
 Ichigo (2019)
 Magnetic (2022)

Filmography 
 Custom Made 10.30 (2005)
 Moomins on the Riviera (2015)

See also 

 Tamio Okuda
 Bae Yong-joon
 Puffy
 Perfume

References

External links 

 ELA Music
 Columbia Records official profile 
 Kaela Kimura official website 
 Official blog 

1984 births
People from Adachi, Tokyo
Living people
Singers from Tokyo
Japanese bloggers
Japanese women pop singers
Japanese people of English descent
Japanese female models
Nippon Columbia artists
Japanese women bloggers
21st-century Japanese singers
21st-century Japanese women singers
Sadistic Mika Band members